Riders of the Dawn is a 1920 American silent Western film directed by Jack Conway and starring Roy Stewart, Claire Adams, and Joseph J. Dowling.

Cast
 Roy Stewart as Kurt Dorn 
 Claire Adams as Lenore Anderson 
 Joseph J. Dowling as Tom Anderson 
 Robert McKim as Henry Neuman 
 Marie Messinger as Kathleen 
 Violet Schram as Olga 
 Arthur Morrison as Olsen 
 Marc B. Robbins as Chris Dorn 
 Fred Starr as Nash 
 Frank Brownlee as Glidden

References

Bibliography
 James Robert Parish & Michael R. Pitts. Film Directors: A Guide to Their American Films. Scarecrow Press, 1974.

External links

 

1920 films
1920 Western (genre) films
1920s English-language films
Films directed by Jack Conway
American black-and-white films
Pathé Exchange films
Films distributed by W. W. Hodkinson Corporation
Silent American Western (genre) films
1920s American films